Ahangaran-e Sofla (also Romanized as Āhangarān-e Soflá; also known as Ebrahim Khani (Persian: ابراهيم خاني), also Romanized as Ebrāhīm Khānī and Ebrāhīm Khān) is a village in Itivand-e Shomali Rural District, Kakavand District, Delfan County, Lorestan Province, Iran. At the 2006 census, its population was 37, in 8 families.

References 

Towns and villages in Delfan County